Arabian Nights is a commonly used English title for One Thousand and One Nights, a Middle-Eastern folk tale collection.

Arabian Nights, Knights or Knight may also refer to:

Comics
 Arabian Nights (comics) (1947), the 8th issue of Classics Illustrated
 Arabian Knight (comics), a Saudi Arabian superhero in the Marvel Comics universe

Films
 The Palace of the Arabian Nights, a 1905 silent fantasy film directed by Georges Méliès
 Arabian Nights (1942 film), a Technicolor film starring Jon Hall and Maria Montez 
 1001 Arabian Nights (1959 film), an animated film starring Mr. Magoo
 Arabian Nights (1974 film), English title of Il fiore delle mille e una notte, an Italian film 
 Scooby-Doo! in Arabian Nights, a 1994 animated telefilm based on The Book of One Thousand and One Nights
 Arabian Knight, alternate title of The Thief and the Cobbler, a 1995 animated film
 Arabian Nights (2015 film), a Portuguese film

Games
 Arabian Nights (1993 video game), a 1993 video game for the Commodore Amiga
 Arabian Nights (Magic: The Gathering), a 1993 expansion to the Magic: The Gathering collectible card game
 Arabian Nights: Sabaku no Seirei-ō, a 1996 Japan-exclusive Super Famicom video game
 Arabian Nights (2001 video game)

Music
 Arabian Nights (album), by The Ritchie Family
 Arabian Nights (ballet), a 1979 ballet composed by Fikret Amirov
 "Arabian Knights" (song) (1981), by Siouxsie & the Banshees
 "Arabian Nights" (song), the main song from the 1992 animated movie Aladdin
 Arabian Knight (record producer), a hip hop producer affiliated with Wu-Tang Clan, active since 1998 
 "Arabian Nights", a song from the 1999 album Midnite Vultures by Beck
 "1001 Arabian Nights" (song), a single by the Dutch band Ch!pz from the 2004 album The World of Ch!pz

Plays
 The Arabian Nights, a 1994 play by Mary Zimmerman 
 Arabian Nights, a 1998 play by Dominic Cooke 
 Arabian Nights, a 2015 short play by David Ives

Television
 Arabian Knights, a 1968–1969 animated segment of The Banana Splits Adventure Hour 
 Arabian Nights (miniseries), a 2000 television miniseries adaptation of The Book of One Thousand and One Nights

Other uses
 Operation Arabian Knight, a 2010 anti-terrorism sting resulting in the arrest of New Jersey men bound for Somalia

See also
 Hare-Abian Nights, a 1959 Warner Bros Merrie Melodies cartoon
 1001 Nights (disambiguation)
 A Thousand and One Nights (disambiguation) 
 One Thousand and One Nights (disambiguation)